S Force was a military brigade of the Bangladesh Armed Forces that was formed under the leadership of Major K M Shafiullah on October 1, 1971. The brigade was composed of the 2nd and 11th East Bengal Regiments.

Background 

On March 25, 1971, the Pakistan Army cracked down on the Bengali population of what was then East Pakistan. They massacred the capital of the East Pakistan that so enraged the Bengali military officials of the Pakistan Army they revolted and joined the Bangladesh Liberation War.

The officers of the 2nd East Bengal Regiment, situated in the Joydevpur Cantonment adjacent to the capital Dhaka, also revolted with other regiments and left the cantonment on March 28, under the leadership of K M Shafiullah. Major Shafiuallah was initially selected as the sector 3 commander.

At the end of June, considering the need of regular brigades to intensify the war against the Pakistan Army, the Provisional Government of Bangladesh decided to form three brigades under the leadership of Majors Ziaur Rahman, Khaled Mosharraf and Shafiullah.

Formation 

Shafiullah, once the second-in-command of the 2nd East Bengal Regiment, was given the mission of organizing a brigade in September 1971. Major ANM Nuruzzaman replaced him as the new commander of sector 3.

 Shafiullah reorganized the two battalions of freedom fighters he had with him who were fighting in sector 3 to form a brigade that is popularly known as S Force. The two battalions were the 2nd and 11th East Bengal Regiments.

He added 1200 new recruits to bring the brigade up to strength after an initial selection process. The new recruits were trained for two months.

The headquarters of S Force was in Fatikchhara.

Organization of the brigade 

 Brigade Commander - Major K M Shafiullah
 Brigade Major – Captain Azizur Rahman
 D-Q Officer - Captain Abul Hossain
 Signal Officer – Flight Lieutenant Rauf

2nd East Bengal Regiment 

 Commanding Officer - Major Moinul Hossain Chowdhury 
 Adjutant - Lieutenant Mohammad Sayed   
 A Company Commander – Major Matiur Rahman 
 B Company Commander – Lieutenant Badiuzzaman
 C Company Commander - Lieutenant Syed Mohammad Ibrahim
 D Company Commander – Lieutenant Ghulam Helal Morshed
 A Company Officer – Second Lieutenant Anisul Hasan 
 B Company Officer - Second Lieutenant Salim Mohammad Kamrul Hasan
 Medical Officer - Lieutenant Abul Hossain

11th East Bengal Regiment 

 Commanding Officer - Major Abu Saleh Mohammad Nasim
 Adjutant - Lieutenant Nasir   
 A Company Commander - Lieutenant Shamsul Huda Bacchu
 B Company Commander – Captain Subid Ali Bhuyan   
 C Company Commander - Second Lieutenant Nazrul Islam
 D Company Commander - Second Lieutenant Abul Hossain
 B Company Officer - Second Lieutenant Kabir
 Medical Officer - Lieutenant Moinul Hossain

Major operations 

S Force was ready for battle by the last week of November. It operated in Akhaura, Mukundpur, Dharmaghar and many other places from the end of November until the independence of Bangladesh was achieved.

See also 

 Z Force (Bangladesh)
 K Force (Bangladesh)

References

Bangladesh Liberation War